Maksim Viktorovich Ionov (born 5 September 1976) is a former Russian professional football player.

Club career
He played in the Russian Football National League for FC Torpedo Volzhsky in 1997.

References

1976 births
Living people
Russian footballers
Association football midfielders
FC Energiya Volzhsky players